Ceromya silacea is a Palearctic species of fly in the family Tachinidae.

Distribution
Germany, United Kingdom, Hungary, Poland Japan, Russia.

Hosts
Protodeltote pygarga.

References

Diptera of Asia
Diptera of Europe
Tachininae
Insects described in 1824